1990 in sports describes the year's events in world sport.

Alpine skiing
 Alpine Skiing World Cup
 Men's overall season champion: Pirmin Zurbriggen, Switzerland

American football
 Super Bowl XXIV – the San Francisco 49ers (NFC) won 55–10 over the Denver Broncos (AFC)
Location: Superdome
Attendance: 72,919
MVP: Joe Montana, QB (San Francisco)
 Sugar Bowl (1989 season):
 The Miami Hurricanes won 33–25 over the Alabama Crimson Tide to win the national championship
 November 11 – Derrick Thomas has 7 sacks for Kansas City Chiefs against Seattle Seahawks.

Association football
 West Germany won the Football World Cup in Rome, Italy, defeating defending champion Argentina 1–0 in the final.
 Ecuador – Ecuadorian Serie A Champions: Liga Deportiva Universitaria de Quito

Athletics
 1990 Commonwealth Games held in Auckland, New Zealand
 1990 European Athletics Championships held in Split, SR Croatia, Yugoslavia

Australian rules football
 Australian Football League
 The Victorian Football League is renamed the Australian Football League
 Collingwood wins the 94th AFL premiership (Collingwood 13.11 (89) to Essendon 5.11 (41))
 Brownlow Medal awarded to Tony Liberatore (Footscray)

Baseball
 March 17 – Taiwan Professional Baseball League, a first official game held.
 June 11 – Nolan Ryan of the Texas Rangers pitched a no-hitter against the Oakland Athletics.
 The Cincinnati Reds sweep the Oakland A's in the World Series.
 Ira Smith becomes the first player in NCAA history to win consecutive batting titles after hitting .519 with the Maryland Eastern Shore Hawks.

Basketball
NBA Finals 
Detroit Pistons win four games to one over the Portland Trail Blazers
National Basketball League (Australia) Finals
Perth Wildcats defeated the Brisbane Bullets 2–1 in the best-of-three final series.
Events
 UNLV wins the NCAA Division I Men's championship
 Yugoslavia wins the FIBA World Championship.
 March 4 – American player Hank Gathers died after collapsing during the semifinals of a West Coast Conference tournament game.

Boxing
 February 11 – Buster Douglas defeated Mike Tyson by a knockout in round 10 to win the world's unified Heavyweight title, in what many consider boxing's biggest upset ever.
 March 17 – Thunder Meets Lightning: Julio César Chávez defeated Meldrick Taylor to unify boxing's world junior welterweight title
 September 22 to October 7 – Asian Games held in Beijing, China
 November 24 to December 3 – Central American and Caribbean Games held in Mexico City

Canadian football
 Grey Cup – Winnipeg Blue Bombers 50–11 over the Edmonton Eskimos
 Vanier Cup – Saskatchewan Huskies win 24–21 over the St. Mary's Huskies

Cycling
 Giro d'Italia won by Gianni Bugno of Italy
 Tour de France – Greg LeMond of the United States
 UCI Road World Championships – Men's road race – Rudy Dhaenens of Belgium

Dogsled racing
 Iditarod Trail Sled Dog Race champion –
 Susan Butcher won with lead dogs: Sluggo & Lightning

Darts
 Phil Taylor (darts player) wins his first world title

Field hockey
 Men's Champions Trophy held in Melbourne won by Australia
 Women's World Cup held in Sydney won by the Netherlands

Figure skating
 World Figure Skating Championships –
 Men's champion: Kurt Browning, Canada
 Ladies' champion: Jill Trenary, United States
 Pair skating champions: Ekaterina Gordeeva & Sergei Grinkov, Soviet Union
 Ice dancing champions: Marina Klimova / Sergei Ponomarenko, Soviet Union

Gaelic Athletic Association
 Camogie
All-Ireland Camogie champion: Kilkenny
National Camogie League: Kilkenny
 Gaelic football
 All-Ireland Senior Football Championship – Cork 0-11 died Meath 0-9
 National Football League – Meath 2-7 died Down 0-11
 Ladies' Gaelic football
 All-Ireland Senior Football Champion: Kerry
 National Football League: Kerry
 Hurling
 All-Ireland Senior Hurling Championship – Cork 5-15 died Galway 2-21
 National Hurling League – Kilkenny 0–19 beat New York 0–9

Golf
Men's professional
 Masters tournament – Nick Faldo
 U.S. Open – Hale Irwin
 British Open – Nick Faldo
 PGA Championship – Wayne Grady
 PGA Tour money leader – Greg Norman – $1,165,477
 Senior PGA Tour money leader – Lee Trevino – $1,190,518
Men's amateur
 British Amateur – Rolf Muntz
 U.S. Amateur – Phil Mickelson
 European Amateur – Klas Erikson
Women's professional
 Nabisco Dinah Shore – Betsy King
 U.S. Women's Open – Betsy King
 LPGA Championship – Beth Daniel
 Classique du Maurier – Cathy Johnston-Forbes
 LPGA Tour money leader – Beth Daniel – $863,578
 The inaugural Solheim Cup match was won by the United States who beat Europe 11½ – 4½

Harness racing
 North America Cup – Apaches Fame
 United States Pacing Triple Crown races –
 Cane Pace – Jake And Elwood
 Little Brown Jug – Beach Towel
 Messenger Stakes – Jake And Elwood
 United States Trotting Triple Crown races –
 Hambletonian – Harmonious
 Yonkers Trot - Royal Troubador
 Kentucky Futurity – Star Mystic
 Australian Inter Dominion Harness Racing Championship –
 Pacers: Thorate
 Trotters: Real Force

Horse racing
Steeplechases
 Cheltenham Gold Cup – Norton's Coin
 Grand National – Mr Frisk
Flat races
 Australia – Melbourne Cup won by Kingston Rule
 Canadian Triple Crown Races:
 Queen's Plate – Izvestia
 Prince of Wales Stakes – Izvestia
 Breeders' Stakes – Izvestia
 For the second straight year, a horse sweeps the series.
 France – Prix de l'Arc de Triomphe won by Saumarez
 Ireland – Irish Derby Stakes won by Salsabil
 Japan – Japan Cup won by Better Loosen Up
 English Triple Crown Races:
 2,000 Guineas Stakes – Tirol
 The Derby – Quest for Fame
 St. Leger Stakes – Snurge
 United States Triple Crown Races:
 Kentucky Derby – Unbridled
 Preakness Stakes – Summer Squall
 Belmont Stakes – Go and Go
 Breeders' Cup World Thoroughbred Championships:
 Breeders' Cup Classic – Unbridled
 Breeders' Cup Distaff – Bayakoa
 Breeders' Cup Juvenile – Fly So Free
 Breeders' Cup Juvenile Fillies – Meadow Star
 Breeders' Cup Mile – Royal Academy
 Breeders' Cup Sprint – Safely Kept
 Breeders' Cup Turf – In the Wings

Ice hockey
 Art Ross Trophy as the NHL's leading scorer during the regular season: Wayne Gretzky, Los Angeles Kings
 Hart Memorial Trophy for the NHL's Most Valuable Player: Mark Messier, Edmonton Oilers
 Stanley Cup – Edmonton Oilers won 4 games to 1 over the Boston Bruins
 World Hockey Championships
 Men's champion: Soviet Union defeated Sweden
 Junior Men's champion: Canada defeated Soviet Union 
 Women's champion: in the inaugural event, Canada defeated United States

Lacrosse
 The 6th World Lacrosse Championship is held in Perth, Australia. The United States win, and Canada is the runner-up.
 The Philadelphia Wings beat the New England Blazers 17–7 in the Major Indoor Lacrosse League Championship.
 The Brooklin Redmen win the Mann Cup.
 Orangeville wins the Founders Cup.
 The St. Catharines Athletics win the Minto Cup.

Motorsport

Radiosport
 The first World Radiosport Team Championship held in Seattle, United States Gold medals won by John Dorr K1AR and Doug Grant K1DG of the United States.
 Fifth Amateur Radio Direction Finding World Championship held in Štrbské Pleso, Czechoslovakia (now Slovakia).

Rugby league
1990–91 French Championship season
1990 Kangaroo tour of Great Britain and France
1990 New Zealand rugby league season
1990 NSWRL season
1990 Pacific Cup
1989–90 Rugby Football League season / 1990–91 Rugby Football League season
1990 State of Origin series
1989–1992 Rugby League World Cup

Rugby union
 96th Five Nations Championship series is won by Scotland who complete the Grand Slam

Snooker
 World Snooker Championship – Stephen Hendry beats Jimmy White 18-12
 World rankings – Stephen Hendry becomes world number one for 1990/91

Swimming
 March 24 – Tom Jager betters his own world record (22.12) in the 50m freestyle (long course) twice at a swimming meet in Nashville, Tennessee, swimming 21.98 in the heats and 21.81 in the final.

Tennis
 Grand Slam in tennis men's results:
 Australian Open – Ivan Lendl
 French Open – Andrés Gómez
 Wimbledon championships – Stefan Edberg
 US Open – Pete Sampras
 Grand Slam in tennis women's results:
 Australian Open – Steffi Graf
 French Open – Monica Seles
 Wimbledon championships – Martina Navratilova
 U.S. Open – Gabriela Sabatini
 Davis Cup – United States won 3–2 over Australia in world tennis.

Triathlon
 ITU World Championships held in Orlando, United States
 ETU European Championships held in Linz, Austria

Volleyball
 FIVB World League 1990 held in Osaka, Japan won by Italy
 1990 FIVB Men's World Championship held in Rio de Janeiro won by Italy
 1990 FIVB Women's World Championship held in Beijing won by USSR

Multi-sport events
 Asian Games held in Beijing, China
 Winter Asian Games held in Sapporo, Japan
 Central American and Caribbean Games held in Mexico City, Mexico
 1990 Commonwealth Games held in Auckland, New Zealand
 Summer Goodwill Games held in Seattle, United States

Awards
 Associated Press Male Athlete of the Year – Joe Montana, National Football League
 Associated Press Female Athlete of the Year – Beth Daniel, LPGA golf
 BBC Overseas Sports Personality of the Year – Mal Meninga, Australian rugby league footballer
 Sports Illustrated Sportsman of the Year - Joe Montana, National Football League

References

 
Sports by year